City Girl is a 1938 American crime film directed by Alfred L. Werker and written by Lester Ziffren, Frances Hyland and Robin Harris. The film stars Ricardo Cortez, Phyllis Brooks, Robert Wilcox, Douglas Fowley, Chick Chandler and Esther Muir. The film was released on January 7, 1938, by 20th Century Fox.

Plot

Bored with her life and with Don, her lawyer boyfriend, waitress Ellen Ward craves excitement. She accepts an invitation from Ritchie and Mike, a couple of petty crooks, and ends up giving them an alibi for a crime. Ritchie rewards her with $100.

Ellen catches the eye racketeer Charles Blake, irking his moll Vivian, who attacks her with a pair of scissors. Ellen shoots her in self-defense. Ellen is badly injured and has her face radically altered by plastic surgery. Don becomes an assistant district attorney and helps an investigation into Blake's activities, with Ellen, no longer recognizable, working undercover. Blake is about to shoot Don when, at the last instant, Ellen steps between them and is killed.

Cast    
Ricardo Cortez as Charles Blake
Phyllis Brooks as Ellen Ward
Robert Wilcox as Donald Sanford
Douglas Fowley as Ritchie
Chick Chandler as Mike Harrison
Esther Muir as Flo Nichols
Adrienne Ames as Vivian Ross

References

External links 
 

1938 films
20th Century Fox films
American crime films
1938 crime films
Films directed by Alfred L. Werker
American black-and-white films
1930s English-language films
1930s American films